Gary L. Wells is an American psychologist and an internationally recognized pioneer and scholar in eyewitness memory research.  Wells is a professor at Iowa State University with a research interest in the integration of both cognitive psychology and social psychology and its interface with law. He has extensive research on lineup procedures and the reliability and accuracy of eyewitness identification, and has been widely acknowledged in both the field of psychology and the criminal justice system.  Wells has received many awards and honorary degrees and been widely recognized for his work and contributions to psychology and the implications his research has made to the legal system.

Media appearances

Wells has been cited in many periodicals across the country with his research on eyewitness memory. Some of the most notable periodicals include:
Time magazine, which discusses the unreliability of eyewitness testimony.
The New York Times, which describes alternative methods that can be used to help reduce false identifications from eyewitnesses.
The Los Angeles Times, which presents some of his research findings on false identifications and eyewitness testimony.
The Chicago Tribune, which describes problems with eyewitness identification.
New Yorker magazine, in which Wells work and career are discussed.

Wells has also appeared on many major television shows discussing his research findings and presenting new ideas and alternatives to help reduce the number of false convictions that occur because of the unreliability of eyewitnesses. Some of his most notable appearances include:
CBS's 48 Hours, where he discussed the stress and accuracy of eyewitness memory
NBC's Nightly News and Today Show
Court TV
60 Minutes
Oprah

Education
B.Sc. Honors (1973) Psychology, Kansas State University
Ph.D. (1977) Experimental Social Psychology, Ohio State University

Career
Wells began his career at the University of Alberta (Canada) and rose to the rank of full professor. In 1989 he became department chair at Iowa State University. Currently, Wells is a distinguished professor of psychology at Iowa State University and the Stavish Chair in the Social Sciences. He is a Fellow of the American Psychological Association, the Association for Psychological Science, and the Society of Experimental Social Psychology. Wells is a past President of the American Psychology-Law Society. He serves as a consultant and speaker to judges, law enforcement, defense counsel, and prosecution counsel regarding issues in eyewitness memory, crime investigation procedures, and evidence evaluation.  Wells has also published work in areas such as attitudes and persuasion, attribution, and judgment and decision making, but his work on eyewitness evidence has had an outsized impact in psychological science and the legal system.

Notable research

Lineup presentations
Using staged-crime experiments for unsuspecting people, Wells' experiments have shaped a scientific understanding of problems with the reliability of eyewitness identification evidence and the role that poor lineup procedures play in contributing to mistaken eyewitness identification and false confidence on the part of eyewitnesses.

Wells introduced the idea of double-blind lineups (Wells, 1990) in, which are lineups conducted by someone who does not know which person in the lineup is the possible suspect and which are merely fillers. The idea of the double-blind lineup is to prevent inadvertent influence on the eyewitness from the lineup administrator. Double-blind lineup procedures are now required in many states and individual jurisdictions across the United States. In 2014, a report from a study committee the National Academy of Sciences endorsed the idea that all lineups should be conducted using double-blind procedures.

Wells also introduced a measure of lineup fairness called functional lineup size (Wells et al., 1979) to distinguish between the number of people in a lineup (nominal lineup size) and the ability of the fillers (innocent stand-ins) to make the lineup fair to the suspect.

In the 1990s, Wells and his Ph.D. student Amy Bradfield (Douglass) discovered that the confidence that eyewitnesses express in their identifications is highly malleable and can be dramatically inflated after making a mistaken identification through simple comments that seem to confirm their choice, a phenomenon known as the post-identification feedback effect.

System and estimator variables
In an influential article in 1978, Wells proposed a distinction between two different types of variables influencing the accuracy of eyewitness identification (Wells, 1978). System-variables are variables that are (or could be) under the control of the justice system (e.g., pre-lineup instructions to witnesses). Estimator-variables are variables that are not under the control of the justice system, but are circumstantial factors that influence identification (e.g. age, race).

Wells proposed that system-variable research would prove to have greater applied utility for criminal justice than estimator-variable research because system-variable research could inform the legal system of ways to reduce the chances of mistaken identification. Wells argued that the rate of misidentifications are influenced by several methodological biases in the methods used by law enforcement to secure the identifications  The system-variable versus estimator-variable distinction that Wells introduced in 1978 has so thoroughly permeated the nomenclature of the eyewitness literature that the terms are now commonly used without attribution to their source.

Bayesian statistics
Wells introduced the idea of using Bayesian statistics to describe eyewitness performance in eyewitness identification experiments (Wells, 2015).  Wells has further developed these Bayesian methods to show how the amount of information (about guilt) gained from eyewitness identification evidence can be quite small and is highly dependent on other (non-witness) evidence.

Laboratory and field research
Wells, along with Steven D. Penrod, also wrote a chapter on "Eyewitness identification research: Strengths and weaknesses of alternative methods" for Research Methods in Forensic Psychology. In this chapter, Wells and Penrod evaluate alternative research methods for eyewitness testimony, including laboratory and field experiments (Wells & Penrod, 2011). Wells and his colleagues collected field experiment data from four police departments and published the data showing that roughly 1/3rd of all identifications made by eyewitnesses resulted in the selection of an innocent stand-in lineup member (Wells, Steblay, & Dysart, 2015).

Real world implications
Wells' 35+ years of research on eyewitness misidentification and work performed with law enforcement and prosecutors has made substantial contributions to court and legal procedures. His involvement with the Innocence Project and appearances he has made with Jennifer Thompson  have helped to inform the legal system about why 75% of all DNA exonerations of innocent people who were convicted by juries in the United States are cases involving mistaken eyewitness identification testimony.

Proper procedures for constructing and eyewitness identification procedures 
Wells worked with many states, starting with New Jersey in 2002 and North Carolina in 2003, to implement state-wide reform of their eyewitness identification procedures. Other states later followed in making reforms to eyewitness identification procedures based on the early models that Wells developed. Most states now require double-blind administration of lineups, pre-lineup instructions to witnesses warning that the culprit might not be in the lineup, the use of lineup fillers so that the suspect does not stand out, and the collection of a confidence statement from the eyewitness at the time of any identification. These same reforms have now been adopted by the International Association of Chiefs of Police.

Court procedures for evaluating eyewitness evidence 
Wells was the first to call into question the U.S. Supreme Court's ruling in Neil versus Biggers (1973) and its later reaffirmation in Manson versus Braithwaite (1977) about how to assess the reliability of eyewitness identification when there is suggestiveness involved in the identification. Wells' later writings have made an even stronger case for how the Court's approach is flawed given the findings in eyewitness science (Wells & Quinlivan, 2009). Recent state supreme court rulings have used Wells' critique of Manson vs. Braithwaite to fashion new approaches to assessing the reliability of eyewitness identification evidence (e.g., State v. Henderson in New Jersey and State v. Lawson in Oregon). In agreement with the basic arguments in the Wells & Quinlivan article, the report from the study committee of the National Academy of Sciences endorsed the idea of casting out the Manson v. Braithwaite approach to evaluating the reliability of eyewitness identifications.
 
Wells' testimony in court cases and eyewitness research on system and estimator variables has influenced legislation and state Supreme Court decisions. States such as New Jersey, North Carolina, Ohio, Vermont, Illinois, and Connecticut, for example, now require double-blind lineups and other safeguards for eyewitness identification evidence that Wells advocated. Wells' work with the U.S. Department of Justice under Attorney General Janet Reno resulted in the first set of national recommendations for law enforcement regarding the collection and preservation of eyewitness evidence (Eyewitness Evidence: A Guide for Law Enforcement).

In 2003, the United States Court of Appeals 7th Circuit upheld Wells' testimony in a Chicago civil suit pertaining to lineup procedures in which the defendant was pardoned innocence after the allegation that the police officer induced the three witnesses to identify him as the perpetrator (Newsome vs. McCabe, 2003). For his testimony, Wells conducted an experiment to examine the likelihood that all three of the witnesses would pick the defendant out of a lineup. The results suggested that the police officers manipulated the lineup due to the probability of picking the defendant being less than one in 1000. Reforms for legal standards in eyewitness identifications have been also noted in other cases such as State v. Larry R. Henderson and questions of constitutionality for eyewitness identifications have been raised (Perry v. New Hampshire).

Honors, awards, and memberships
Distinguished Professor at Iowa State University
Distinguished Professor of Liberal Arts and Sciences
James Mckeen Cattell Award for the Association for Psychological Sciences
On August 18, 2010, was awarded the first ever Stavish Chair in the Social Sciences at Iowa State University.
Distinguished Alumni Award, Department of Psychology, Kansas State university
Distinguished Alumni Award, Department of Psychology, Ohio State University
Distinguished Contribution awards from the American Psychology-Law Society.
Presidential Citation Award from the American Psychological Association.
Honorary doctorate from John Jay College of Criminal Justice.
American Psychological Association (Member and Fellow)
Association for Psychological Science (Member and Fellow)
Personality and Social Psychology (APA Division 8)
Society for Personality and Social Psychology (Fellow)
American Psychology-Law Society (APA Division 41, Fellow, past President)
Society of Experimental Social Psychology (Member and Fellow)
Judgment and Decision Making Society
Psychonomic Society
Society for Applied Research in Memory and Cognition
American Judicature Society
Midwestern Psychological Association (Charter Fellow)

Publications
Wells has authored over 175 articles and chapters in books on his research dealing with eyewitness memory and eyewitness testimony. Some of the most notable journals that Wells has been published in include Psychological Bulletin, American Psychologist, Journal of Personality and Social Psychology, Journal of Experimental Psychology: Applied, Psychological Science, Law and Human Behavior, and Journal of Applied Psychology.

Wells also co-authored Eyewitness Testimony: Psychological Perspectives, with Elizabeth Loftus. This book was published on May 25, 1984. The book examines topics such as eyewitness memory as a function of age, the adequacy of intuition in judging eyewitness memory, and the relationship between confidence and accuracy.

References

http://public.psych.iastate.edu/glwells/Brief_Biographical_Sketch_of_Gary_L_Wells.pdf

https://web.archive.org/web/20111012213208/http://www.las.iastate.edu/LASnews/stavishchair.shtml

http://wells.socialpsychology.org/

http://www.all-about-forensic-psychology.com/eyewitness-testimony.html

http://www.psychology.iastate.edu/~glwells/mediashots.html

http://www.innocenceproject.org

https://www.ncjrs.gov/pdffiles1/nij/178240.pdf

https://supreme.justia.com/cases/federal/us/432/98/case.html

https://supreme.justia.com/cases/federal/us/409/188/

https://casetext.com/case/newsome-v-mccabe-3

http://www.palmbeachpost.com/opinion/editorials/mandatory-police-minimums-1454539.html?cxtype=rss_editorials

https://web.archive.org/web/20111009023147/http://www.atlantaprogressivenews.com/news/0291.html

Wells, G. L. (1978). Applied eyewitness testimony research: System variables and estimator variables. Journal of Personality and Social Psychology, 36, 1546–1557.

Wells, G. L. & Bradfield, A. L. (1998). “Good, you identified the suspect:” Feedback to eyewitnesses distorts their reports of the witnessing experience. Journal of 
Applied Psychology, 83, 360–376.

Wells, G. L., Leippe, M. R., & Ostrom, T. M.  (1979).  Guidelines for empirically assessing the fairness of a lineup.  Law and Human Behavior, 3, 285–293.

Wells, G. L., & Lindsay, R. C. L.  (1980). On estimating the diagnosticity of eyewitness nonidentifications.  Psychological Bulletin, 88, 776–784.

Wells, G. L., & Luus, E.  (1990). Police lineups as experiments:  Social methodology as a framework for properly-conducted lineups.  Personality and Social Psychology Bulletin, 16, 106–117.

Wells, G. L., & Quinlivan, D. S. (2009). Suggestive eyewitness identification procedures and the  Supreme Court's reliability test in light of eyewitness science: 30 years later. Law and Human Behavior, 33, 1-24.

Wells, G. L., Steblay, N. K., & Dysart, J. E. (2015). Double-bind photo-lineups using actual eyewitnesses: An experimental test of a sequential versus simultaneous lineup procedure. Law and Human Behavior, 39, 1–14.

Wells, G. L., & Penrod, S. D. (2011). Eyewitness identification research: Strengths and weaknesses of alternative methods. In B. Rosenfeld, & S. D. Penrod (Eds.), Research methods in forensic psychology. John Wiley and Sons, Hoboken, NJ.

Year of birth missing (living people)
Kansas State University alumni
Ohio State University Graduate School alumni
Iowa State University faculty
Living people
21st-century American psychologists
Memory researchers